The International Foundation for Protection Officers (IFPO) board of directors established and maintains a voluntary certification process called the Certified Protection Officers (CPO) course, which is based on current and valid standards that measure competency in the practice of private security for security officers. The IFPO requires that all programs that offer a certification must be maintained by the individual through a re-certification process. Therefore the CPO certificate is valid for a period of two years, at which time re-certification must be achieved.

Qualified certified protection officers can also obtain the designation of CPO instructor.  This is a designation that requires qualification and the proper credentials.

After 1998, when the Universal Declaration of Human Rights defenders passed, many international and regional NGOs created a post for protection officers. The post is for expertise in security and risk assessment officers who are responsible for safety of human rights defenders.

Simplified course outline
Physical security applications
Alarm system fundamentals
Access control
Information security
Protection officers and emergency response
Strikes, lockouts and labour relations
Workplace violence
Effective communications
Environmental crime control theory
Emergency planning and disaster control
Use of force continuum
Ethics and professionalism

External links
 Official course
 Certified protection officer program:
 https://ifpo.org/education/cpo/

Professional titles and certifications